Manmatha is a 2007 Indian Kannada-language comedy drama film directed by N.Rajesh Fernandes. starring Jaggesh and Gurleen Chopra in a dual role. The film is a remake of Malayalam film Kunjikoonan (2002) starring Dileep and Navya Nair.

Synopsis
Putswamy is an ugly village youth who covers up his handicap with humor. Despite jibes directed at him, he looks for a bride with the help of his friend.

Soorya is a violent college student who loves his classmate, Priya. She comes across Chinna, who assures her that he will get her married to the man of her heart. She is killed in a fracas involving a gangster. Meanwhile, the hunchback Putswamy comes across an orphaned poor blind girl, Lakshmi. He wins her heart by helping to transplant the eyes of the deceased Priya to Lakshmi, who regains her vision. This results in a fight between Putswamy and Soorya as to whom Lakshmi belongs. Putswamy is a hunchback, so he decides to leave way for Soorya. But fate has something else in store for him.

Cast
Jaggesh in dual role as  Puttaswamy and Soorya 
Gurleen Chopra in dual role as Priya and Lakshmi 
Komal Kumar
Umesh
 Killer Venkatesh
 Janardhan
 Chetan Rai
Biradar
 Ratnakar 
 Arasikere Raju
Pooja Gandhi as herself in the song "Hunnime Banna"

Soundtrack

References

External links
Manmatha Movie Review

2007 romantic comedy films
2007 films
2000s Kannada-language films
Kannada remakes of Malayalam films
Indian romantic comedy films